Bailey Zimmerman (born January 27, 2000) is an American country music artist. In 2022, he charted the singles "Fall in Love" and "Rock and a Hard Place".

Early life
Zimmerman was born in Louisville, Illinois. Prior to making music, he worked in the meat-packing industry and for a union gas pipeline.

Career
In December 2020, Zimmerman began posting original music to his TikTok account. In January 2021, he released his debut single "Never Comin' Home", which later entered the top 20 on Spotify's Viral Chart in the United States.

After initially releasing in February 2022, "Fall in Love" reached number 31 on the Billboard Hot 100 in August. This was followed by additional singles "Rock and a Hard Place" and "Where It Ends" in June and August 2022, respectively. Due to the success of these songs, Zimmerman was signed to Warner Music Nashville and Elektra Records, with "Fall in Love" later charting at Country radio format.

Zimmerman released his debut major-label project Leave the Light On on October 14, 2022. It debuted in the top ten of the Billboard 200 and Canadian Albums charts. As a result of high demand, Zimmerman extended his headlining tour of the United States into the fall of 2022, with Josh Ross opening his early 2023 dates.

On March 17, 2023, Zimmerman announced that his debut album Religiously. The Album. will be released on May 12, 2023.

Discography

Studio albums

Extended plays

Singles

Promotional singles

Other charted songs

Notes

References

American country singers
Living people
Country musicians from Illinois
Warner Records artists
21st-century American male singers
21st-century American singers
People from Clay County, Illinois
Singers from Illinois
2000 births